Ray Ray or Ray-Ray may refer to:

Ray Ray (album), a 2004 album by Raphael Saadiq
Ray-Ray Armstrong (born 1991), American football player
Ray-Ray McCloud (born 1996), American football player
Ray Ray, a member of American boy band Mindless Behavior
Ray Ray, a character from American TV series The Life and Times of Juniper Lee

See also
Ray Ray From Summerhill, a 2018 album by YFN Lucci